Bernd Fischer may refer to:

 Bernd Fischer (mathematician) (1936–2020), German mathematician
 Bernd Jürgen Fischer, historian and professor of history at Indiana University-Purdue University Fort Wayne